Impatiens bokorensis is a flowering plant of the family Balsaminaceae, only known to be found in the Phnum Bokor National Park in the Kampot Province of Cambodia.

Impatiens bokorensis is known to flower in August and fruit in November, producing small capsules with scurfy hair that contain three to four seeds.

The plant can be distinguished from its most similar cousin I. patula by its orbicular-obovate dorsal petal, shorter pedicels and larger seeds.

References

bokorensis
Plants described in 2017